The Miombo scrub robin (Cercotrichas barbata), is a species of bird in the family Muscicapidae. It is found in Angola, Burundi, Democratic Republic of the Congo, Malawi, Mozambique, Tanzania, and Zambia.

Its natural habitat is subtropical or tropical dry forests.

References

Miombo scrub robin
Birds of Southern Africa
Miombo scrub robin
Taxonomy articles created by Polbot
Taxobox binomials not recognized by IUCN